Spaulding Rocks is a somewhat isolated group of rocks lying 11 nautical miles (20 km) northeast of Mount Warner in the Ford Ranges of Marie Byrd Land. Mapped by United States Antarctic Service (USAS) (1939–41) and by United States Geological Survey (USGS) from surveys and U.S. Navy air photos (1959–65). Named by Advisory Committee on Antarctic Names (US-ACAN) for Howard R. Spaulding, U.S. Navy, builder at Byrd Station in 1966.

Rock formations of Marie Byrd Land